Jacques Krabal (born 10 April 1948) is a French politician. He was elected to the French National Assembly on 17 June 2012, as part of the Radical Party of the Left and re-elected on 18 June 2017,  as part of La République En Marche!, representing the 5th constituency of the department of Aisne. He was also elected Château-Thierry's mayor on 20 March 2008 and re-elected on 30 March 2014 until 5 July 2017.

In May 2022, he announced that he would be standing down at the 2022 French legislative election.

See also
 2017 French legislative election

References

External links
 page on the National Assembly Website

1948 births
Living people
Deputies of the 14th National Assembly of the French Fifth Republic
Deputies of the 15th National Assembly of the French Fifth Republic
La République En Marche! politicians